American Experience is a television program airing on the Public Broadcasting Service (PBS) in the United States. The program airs documentaries about important or interesting events and people in American history. As of 2020 the show has aired 32 seasons and a total of 350 episodes. Throughout its run the show has received multiple awards and nominations, several episodes have won a Peabody Award and many have been nominated to awards given by guilds like the Directors Guild of America Awards and the Writers Guild of America Awards. Three episodes of the series have been nominated for Best Documentary Feature at the Academy Awards (D-Day Remembered in 1994, Troublesome Creek: A Midwestern and The Battle Over Citizen Kane in 1995). Also, the series was received twelve Primetime Emmy Award out of over forty nominations, including Outstanding Documentary or Nonfiction Series twice in 1998 and 1999, being the inaugural winners of the category, Outstanding Documentary or Nonfiction Special for Scottsboro: An American Tragedy in 2001 and JFK in 2014 and Exceptional Merit in Documentary Filmmaking for Two Days in October in 2006 and Freedom Riders in 2011.

Academy Awards

Cinema Audio Society Awards

Directors Guild of America Awards

News & Documentary Emmy Awards

Peabody Award

Primetime Emmy Awards

Television Critics Association Awards

Writers Guild of America Awards

References

External links
American Experience website

 
American Experience